V. P. Sivakolundhu is an Indian politician. He was elected to the Puducherry Legislative Assembly from Lawspet, Puducherry in the 2016 Puducherry Legislative Assembly election as a member of the Indian National Congress. He was elected as Speaker of Puducherry Legislative Assembly after V. Vaithilingam was elected to Lok Sabha in 2019.

References

Living people
Speakers of Puducherry Legislative Assembly
Indian National Congress politicians from Puducherry
People from Puducherry
Year of birth missing (living people)
Puducherry MLAs 2016–2021